William V (1000–1064) was the count of Auvergne after succeeding his father, Robert I, in 1032. He made donations to the church of Clermont in 1030 and 1034. At Pentecost 1059 he assisted at the coronation of Philip I. In 1054 he married Philipa, daughter of Stephen, count of Gévaudan. William died in 1064, and was succeeded by his son Robert II, who also inherited the county of Gévaudan.

William V's daughter, Philippina, married Archimbald IV, baron of Bourbon (1064–1078).

This text is translated from the French Wikipedia.

References 

Counts of Auvergne
1000 births
1064 deaths
Place of birth unknown